Azusa Yamauchi (born 11 September 1998) is a Japanese archer. In 2019, she competed in the women's recurve event at the 2019 Summer Universiade held in Naples, Italy. She also competed in the women's individual event at the 2020 Summer Olympics.

References

External links
 

1998 births
Living people
Japanese female archers
Competitors at the 2019 Summer Universiade
Olympic archers of Japan
Archers at the 2020 Summer Olympics
Place of birth missing (living people)
21st-century Japanese women